Hellgate is a 1952 American Western film directed by Charles Marquis Warren and starring Sterling Hayden. It was the second of three films Warren made for Robert L. Lippert as a writer/director.

Plot
Hellgate Prison is an aptly named facility in the desert where the worst criminals are sent. Hanley, a veterinarian and former Civil War soldier, is falsely accused and convicted of a crime. He is sentenced to this hellish place.

He immediately gets on the wrong side of Voorhees, a vicious guard, and Redfield, a mean convict. Hanley will need to fight his way out, particularly when the prisoners are afflicted with an epidemic of a spreading plague.

Cast
 Sterling Hayden as Gilman S. Hanley
 Joan Leslie as Ellen Hanley
 Ward Bond as Lt. Tod Voorhees
 James Arness as George Redfield
 Peter Coe as Jumper Hall
 John Pickard as Gundy Boyd
 Robert Wilke as Sgt. Maj. Kearn
 Kyle James as Vern Brechene
 Richard Emory as Dan Mott

See also
 Sterling Hayden filmography

References

External links
 

1952 films
1952 Western (genre) films
American Western (genre) films
American prison films
American black-and-white films
Films directed by Charles Marquis Warren
Films scored by Paul Dunlap
Lippert Pictures films
1950s English-language films
1950s American films